The 44th International 500-Mile Sweepstakes was held at the Indianapolis Motor Speedway in Speedway, Indiana on Monday, May 30, 1960. The event was part of the 1960 USAC National Championship Trail and was also race 3 of 10 in the 1960 World Championship of Drivers. It would be the final time World Championship points would be awarded at the Indy 500.

Often regarded as the greatest two-man duel in Indianapolis 500 history, the 1960 race saw a then-record 29 lead changes (a record that stood until 2012). Jim Rathmann and Rodger Ward battled out nearly the entire second half. Rathmann took the lead for good on lap 197 after Ward was forced to slow down with a worn out tire. Rathmann's margin of victory of 12.75 seconds was the second-closest finish in Indy history at the time.

The inaugural 500 Festival Open Invitation was held at the Speedway Golf Course in the four days leading up to the race.

Time trials
Time trials was scheduled for four days, but the third day was rained out.

Saturday May 14 – Pole Day time trials
Eddie Sachs set a track record of 146.592 mph to win the pole position.
Sunday May 15 – Second day time trials
Saturday May 21 – Third day time trials
The third day of time trials was rained out.
Sunday May 22 – Fourth day time trials
Jim Hurtubise nearly broke the elusive and much-anticipated 150 mph barrier. Hurtubise's four-lap qualifying average of 149.056 mph featured a new one-lap record of 149.601 mph (on lap 3), to establish himself as the fastest qualifier in the field.

After Carburetion tests, Dempsey Wilson replaced Jimmy Daywalt as the driver for the #23 entry, and the car was moved to the rear of the starting grid.

Race recap

First half
The race started out with four contenders in the first half. Rodger Ward took the lead on lap 1 from the outside of the front row, but polesitter Eddie Sachs took the lead on lap 2. Two laps later, Ward was back in the lead, and the record-setting number of lead changes was already under way. Troy Ruttman and Jim Rathmann also took turns at the front. .

The first caution came out on lap 47, after Duane Carter spun in turn 3. He did not hit the wall, came to a rest in the infield grass, then continued in the race. Later, Jim McWithey came into the pits without any brakes. He brushed the inside pit wall trying to slow the car down, but continued through the pit lane and wasn't able to stop until he reached the infield grass in turn 1. Later in the race, Eddie Russo and Wayne Weiler also suffer single-car crashes.

Rodger Ward stalled his engine twice during his first pit stop, losing considerable ground. After getting back on the track, he started charging to catch up to the front of the field. Shortly after the halfway point, Eddie Sachs and Troy Ruttman would both drop out of the race, ultimately leaving Rathmann and Ward to battle it out in front.

Second half
On about lap 124, Tony Bettenhausen came in for a routine pit stop. He complained of a smoking engine, but returned to the track. One lap later, he was back in the pits with a fire and a blown engine. Bettenhausen was unhurt, but hoisted himself out of the cockpit as it was coasting to stop in the pits to avoid getting burned.

In the second half, Ward had caught up to Rathmann, with Johnny Thomson close behind in third. Rathmann and Ward swapped the lead several times, but meanwhile Ward was hoping that the pace would slow down, in order to save his tires to the end. After stalling in the pits earlier, the hard charge Ward made to get back to the front was a concern, as he was afraid he had worn out his tires prematurely. Ward was aware of Rathmann's tendencies as a driver, and allowed Rathmann to pass him for the lead. Rathmann was known for charging hard to take the lead, but once he was in the lead, would often back the pace down. Ward's prediction came true, but it was at the expense of losing ground to third place. Johnny Thomson was now catching up.

With Thomson closing in on the leaders, Ward and Rathmann started charging again, racing each other hard, swapping the lead between themselves. Meanwhile, Thomson's engine lost power, and he slowed to a 5th-place finish. Inside ten laps to go, Rodger Ward seemed to have the faster car, and took the lead on lap 194. A few laps later though, Ward saw the cords in his right front tire showing, and he let off the pace. Jim Rathmann took the lead on lap 197, and pulled away for victory. Due to Ward's experience as a tire tester, he was able to nurse his car to the finish without pitting to change the bad tire, and held on to second place. Despite winning twice (1959 and 1962), Rodger Ward often considered this race his personal best.

Paul Goldsmith charged from 26th starting position to finish 3rd, holding off 4th place Don Branson by about a car length.

Box score

Alternates
First alternate: Chuck Rodee  (#89)

Failed to qualify

Chuck Arnold (#21)
Foster Campbell  (#62) – Entry declined, not enough experience
Bill Cheesbourg (#45)
Bob Cleberg  (#61)
Leon Clum  (#95) – Entry declined, not enough experience
Russ Congdon  (#79)
Jimmy Daywalt (#23) – Raced by Dempsey Wilson
Duke Dinsmore (#95)
Lee Drollinger  (#58)
Jack Ensley  (#17)
Cotton Farmer  (#31, #69)
Cliff Griffith (#29)
Norm Hall  (#31, #39, #92)
Chuck Hulse  (#43, #69)
Eddie Jackson  (#62) – Entry declined, not enough experience
Bruce Jacobi  (#95) – Entry declined, not enough experience
Al Keller (#35, #57)
Mike Magill (#77)
Jim Packard  (#71)
Marvin Pifer  (#87)
Ebb Rose  (#41)
Jack Rounds  (#52)
Paul Russo (#31, #47, #49)
Gig Stephens  (#21)
Johnnie Tolan (#24)
Jack Turner (#25, #31)
Bob Wente  (#95) – Did not finish rookie test
Chuck Weyant (#87, #88)

Lap leaders

1 Ward
2–3 Sachs
4–18 Ward
19–24 Ruttman
25–37 J. Rathmann
38–41 Ward
42–51 Sachs
52–56 Ruttman
57–61 Sachs
62–69 J. Rathmann
70–72 Sachs
73–74 J. Rathmann
75 Sachs
76–85 J. Rathmann
86–95 Thomson
96–122 J. Rathmann
123–127 Ward
128–141 J. Rathmann
142–146 Ward
147 J. Rathmann
148–151 Ward
152–162 J. Rathmann
163–169 Ward
170 J. Rathmann
171–177 Ward
178–182 J. Rathmann
183–189 Ward
190–193 J. Rathmann
194–196 Ward
197–200 J. Rathmann

Race notes 
Fastest Lead Lap: Jim Rathmann – 1:01.59
The 1960 Indianapolis 500 was the final 500 which featured a 33-car field consisting of all front-engined cars.
Climate historians would consider this to be the "traditional" climate for an Indianapolis 500 race.
Despite some published claims that it was Smokey Yunick, the race-winning chief mechanic for Rathmann was Takeo "Chickie" Hirashima.

Spectator fatalities
Two spectators in the infield, Fred H. Linder, 36, of Indianapolis, and William C. Craig, 37, of Zionsville, were killed, and as many as 82 were injured, when a homemade scaffolding collapsed. Approximately 125–130 patrons had paid a small fee ($5–$10) to view the race from the 30-foot tall scaffolding, erected by a private individual (Wilbur Shortridge, Jr.) and not the Speedway – a practice that was allowed at the time. The structure was partially anchored to a pick-up truck, and situated in the infield of turn three. Over the years, the private scaffold platforms had become a popular fixture at the Speedway, with often many located around the massive infield. They were not sponsored by the track, and at times, the track management would attempt to curtail the practice, with safety in mind. However, enforcement was inconsistent, and they were not banned outright prior to 1960.

During the parade lap as the field drove by, the people on the platform began to lean and wave at the cars, which caused the scaffolding to become unstable. It soon tipped forward and fell to the ground, crushing people who were underneath the structure, and the 125–130 people who were on it either fell or jumped to the ground. Linder and Craig were pronounced dead of broken necks, and over 80 were injured, about 22 seriously.

After the accident, the Speedway banned "bootleg" homemade scaffolds at the track, a rule that still exists to this day. The track management was scrutinized by the state fire marshal and other officials for allowing the scaffolds to be constructed without permits, inspections, or any sort of safety rules. Other reports even criticized spectators who witnessed the tragedy and did little to offer help, whereas many in attendance were totally unaware of the accident. Johnny Rutherford, who was attending the race for the first time as a spectator, claims to have witnessed the accident. In addition, his future wife Betty Hoyer, a student nurse, attended to the scene.

Championship standings after the race

Formula One Drivers' Championship standings

Formula One Constructors' Championship standings

 Notes: Only the top five positions are included for both sets of standings. Also, points scored in the 500 did not count towards the F1 constructors championship.

Broadcasting

Radio
The race was carried live on the IMS Radio Network. Sid Collins served as chief announcer. Fred Agabashian served as "driver expert" for the second year. After the race, Luke Walton reported from victory lane.

For the first time, the network reached South Africa via tape-delay rebroadcasts.

References

External links

Indianapolis 500 History: Race & All-Time Stats – Official Site
1960 Indianapolis 500 Radio Broadcast, Indianapolis Motor Speedway Radio Network

1960 in motorsport
1960 Formula One races
1960
May 1960 sports events in the United States
1960 in sports in Indiana
1960 in American motorsport